Aqar-e Olya (also Romanized as Aqar-e ‘Olyā and Aqar ‘Olyā; also known as Aqar, Aqar-e Bālā, and ‘Aqar-e Bālā) is a village in Fariman Rural District, in the Central District of Fariman County, Razavi Khorasan Province, Iran. At the 2006 census, its population was 993, in 202 families.

See also 

 List of cities, towns and villages in Razavi Khorasan Province

References 

Populated places in Fariman County